Sara(h) Wood may refer to:

 Sara Wood (novelist), British romance novelist
 Sally Wood (writer), born Sarah Wood (1759–1854), American novelist
 Sarah Wood (businesswoman), British businesswoman
 Sara Ann Wood (born 1981), an American missing girl who disappeared in 1993

See also
 Sara Woods, pseudonym of Lana Bowden-Judd (1922–1985), British mystery writer